HMS Megaera was a Hermes-class wooden paddle sloop of the Royal Navy. She was built at Sheerness Dockyard. She was launched in 1837 and served two commissions before being wrecked at Jamaica in 1843.

Megaera was the second named vessel since it was used for a 14-gun Fireship, launched by Teague of Ipswich in May 1783 and sold to J. Darkin on 3 April 1817.

Construction
She was ordered on 19 November 1834 to be built at Sheerness Dockyard. She was laid down in August 1836 and launched on 17 August 1837. She was towed to Limehouse for the fitting of her machinery starting in 6 October1837 and completing on 13 February 1838 then towed back to Sheerness. She was completed for sea at Sheerness on 30 March 1838 at a cost of £27,778 including £15,161 for the hull and £8,983 for the machinery.

Commissioned service

First commission
She was commissioned on 13 December 1837 under the command of Lieutenant Hugh Coville Goldsmith, RN for service as a packet vessel in the Mediterranean. She returned to Home waters. paying off in October 1841. Lieutenant Goldsmith died on 8 October 1841. At this point she underwent a refit starting at Limehouse, then continuing at Woolwich and finally completing at Deptford from March to December 1842. During the refit she had her boilers replaced, a smoke consuming apparatus was fitted and her armament was probably changed.

Second commission
On 10 November 1842 she was commissioned under the command of Lieutenant George Oldmixon, RN for service on the North America and West Indies Station.

Loss
On 4 March 1843 she was wrecked on Bare Bush Key (off Port Royal), Jamaica.

Notes

Citations

References
 Lyon Winfield, The Sail & Steam Navy List, All the Ships of the Royal Navy 1815 to 1889, by David Lyon & Rif Winfield, published by Chatham Publishing, London © 2004, 
 Winfield, British Warships in the Age of Sail (1817–1863), by Rif Winfield, published by Seaforth Publishing, England © 2014, e, Chapter 11 Steam Paddle Vessels, Vessels acquired since November 1830, Hermes Class
 Colledge, Ships of the Royal Navy, by J.J. Colledge, revised and updated by Lt Cdr Ben Warlow and Steve Bush, published by Seaforth Publishing, Barnsley, Great Britain, © 2020, e  (EPUB), Section H (Hermes)

 

Paddle sloops of the Royal Navy
1837 ships